Vivaldo Francisco Eduardo (born September 11, 1966), is a team handball coach. He has been the head coach of the Angola women's national handball team at the 2011 and 2013 World Women's Handball Championships in Brazil and Serbia.

Vivaldo is the spouse of Angolan team handball former star player Marcelina Kiala.

References

Living people
1966 births
Angolan handball coaches